Ashtabula Township is a civil township in Barnes County, North Dakota, United States. As of the 2000 census, its population was 93.

The Sheyenne River runs through Ashtabula Township.  The Baldhill Dam on the river creates Lake Ashtabula.

References

External links
Contour and boating map of Lake Ashtabula

Townships in Barnes County, North Dakota
Townships in North Dakota